Leerdamse Racing Club uit Leerdam, known as LRC Leerdam, is a football club from Leerdam, Netherlands. The club was founded in 1958. The first male squad plays in the Eerste Klasse since 2016, when it relegated after a year in the Hoofdklasse.

References

External links
 Official site

Football clubs in the Netherlands
Football clubs in Utrecht (province)
Association football clubs established in 1958
1958 establishments in the Netherlands
Sport in Vijfheerenlanden